Püreviin Jigjidsüren (born 15 May 1947 in Aldarkhaan, Zavkhan) is a Mongolian chess FIDE International Master (IM) (1988), FIDE Trainer (2015), and a Mongolian Chess Championship winner (1985).

Biography
From the 1970s to the 1980s Püreviin Jigjidsüren was one of Mongolian leading chess players. In 1988 he won the Mongolian Chess Championship.

Püreviin Jigjidsüren played for Mongolia in the Chess Olympiads:
 In 1970, at first reserve board in the 19th Chess Olympiad in Siegen (+3, =3, -2),
 In 1972, at fourth board in the 20th Chess Olympiad in Skopje (+3, =4, -5),
 In 1980, at third board in the 24th Chess Olympiad in La Valletta (+6, =3, -5),
 In 1982, at second board in the 25th Chess Olympiad in Lucerne (+5, =2, -7).

References

External links

Püreviin Jigjidsüren chess games at 365chess.com

1947 births
Living people
People from Zavkhan Province
Mongolian chess players
Chess Olympiad competitors
Chess International Masters
20th-century chess players